A gubernatorial election was held on 4 February 2018 to elect the next governor of the Nagasaki Prefecture. Incumbent Governor Hōdō Nakamura ran for a third consecutive term, challenged by Toshihiko Haraguchi from the Japanese Communist Party.

Candidates 

Hōdō Nakamura, 67, incumbent since 2010, endorsed by LDP and Komeito.
Toshihiko Haraguchi, 56, secretary-general of the JCP’s Nagasaki chapter.

Campaign 

While Haraguchi focused his campaign on welfare issues, Nakamura prioritized the creation of new jobs and the domestic migration from other Japanese prefectures. Subsequently, Nakamura came out victorious, securing his third term by receiving 76.8% of the votes.

Results

References 

Nagasaki gubernational elections
2018 elections in Japan
February 2018 events in Japan